Lunatics: A Love Story is a 1991 comedy romance film with neo-noir (especially psycho-noir) connections written and directed by Josh Becker, starring Ted Raimi, Deborah Foreman and Bruce Campbell. The film tells the story of a young, paranoid aspiring poet who, after an accidental phone conversation with a seemingly sweet woman, is forced to overcome his worries in order to win her heart. The film’s music was composed by Joseph LoDuca, and was edited by Kaye Davis.

Plot
In a rough area in Los Angeles, an aspiring poet has spent six months without leaving his apartment because of his obsessive delusions concerning cruel doctors, rappers, and spiders. Meanwhile, a woman who appears to curse things by wanting to help is dumped by her boyfriend and finds herself flat broke on the streets of LA. Soon she runs into a local gang. Due to a telephone glitch, our hero calls her at a phone booth trying to dial a "talk line" and invites her to his place. There they are forced to aid each other in overcoming their particular problems.

Cast
Deborah Foreman as Nancy
Ted Raimi as Hank 
Bruce Campbell as Ray
George Aguilar as Comet
Brian McCree as Presto

References

External links
 
 

1991 films
American romantic comedy films
1991 romantic comedy films
Films shot in Michigan
Films directed by Josh Becker
American neo-noir films
1990s English-language films
1990s American films